Pammene populana, the pygmy piercer, is a species of moth of the family Tortricidae. It is found in most of Europe, except Portugal, the Balkan Peninsula and Ukraine. The habitat consists of woodland, marshes, riverbanks, fens and sand dunes.

The wingspan is 10–15 mm. Adults have a yellowish blotch on the dorsum with a darker central spot. Meyrick describes it - Forewings dark fuscous, costa posteriorly strigulated with whitish ; a triangular ochreous-white median dorsal blotch, apex somewhat bent posteriorly, including a small triangular dark fuscous dorsal spot ; three streaks from costa and margins of ocellus leaden-metallic. Hindwings dark fuscous, base lighter. Larva whitish-green; head black; plate of 2 black, anteriorly whitish-green.

They are on wing from July to August.

The larvae feed on Salix species. They spin a shelter from leaf fragments.

References

Moths described in 1787
Grapholitini